Lutherkirche or Luther Church are common names for churches named after Martin Luther in German-speaking countries.

Churches named Lutherkirche include:
Lutherkirche (Königsberg)
Lutherkirche, Wiesbaden
a church in Apolda
a church in Bad Harzburg
a church in Cologne
a church in Lübeck dedicated to the Lübeck martyrs
a church in Montabaur
a church in Schöneberg which hosts the American Church in Berlin
a church in Schwarzheide
a church in Tambach-Dietharz
German name of Church of Luther, Riga

German words and phrases
Martin Luther